Dion is a genus of skippers in the family Hesperiidae.

Species
Recognised species in the genus Dion include:
 Dion agassus (Mabille, 1891)
 Dion carmenta (Hewitson, 1870)
 Dion gemmatus (Butler, 1872)
 Dion iccius (Evans, 1955)
 Dion meda (Hewitson, 1877)
 Dion uza (Hewitson, 1877)

References

Natural History Museum Lepidoptera genus database

Hesperiinae
Hesperiidae genera